The Jawa 700 was a car produced by Jawa in Czechoslovakia during the 1930s.

Background
František Janeček, the founder of the successful Czech motorcycle manufacturer Jawa, signed a license agreement with Jørgen Skafte Rasmussen of DKW on 20 July 1933 to produce the German company's cars in Czechoslovakia. The first fruit of this agreement was the Jawa 700, based on the DKW F2 Meisterklasse, which was known internally as the 701.

Design
The 700 was a front-wheel drive vehicle with a two stroke engine. It differed from its DKW parent in having a  longer wheelbase and  wheels. Unusually, as cars in Czechoslovakia drove on the left at the time, the car was left hand drive.

Production
The 700 was launched at the 1934 Prague Motor Show. Priced at 22,900 CSK in its four-seater guise, 1,002 vehicles were manufactured before production ceased in June 1937.

Performance

References

Cars introduced in 1934
Cars of the Czech Republic
Front-wheel-drive vehicles
Sedans
Roadsters